René Cloërec (Paris, 31 May 1911 – Saint-Cloud, 13 December 1995) Opta was a French composer and conductor. While primarily known as a film score composer, he also wrote songs for Edith Piaf.

Selected filmography
 Devil in the Flesh (1947)
 En cas de malheur (Love Is My Profession, 1958)
 La Traversée de Paris (The Trip Across Paris, 1956)
 Marguerite de la nuit (Marguerite of the Night, 1955)
 The Affair of the Poisons (1955)
 Le Rouge et le Noir (The Red and the Black, 1954)
 Stain in the Snow (1954)
 Good Lord Without Confession (1953)
 Les Sept péchés capitaux (1952)
 The Red Inn (1951)
 God Needs Men (1950)
 Jeannot l'intrépide (Johnny the Giant Killer, 1950)
 Le diable au corps (Devil in the Flesh, 1947)
 Sylvie and the Ghost (1946)
 Gringalet (1946)
 La Cage aux rossignols (A Cage of Nightingales, 1945)

Notes and references

External links

1911 births
1995 deaths
French film score composers
French male film score composers
French people of Breton descent
Musicians from Paris
20th-century French composers
20th-century French male musicians